Albert Urrea Baró (born 1 March 1987) is a Spanish former footballer who played as a midfielder.

Club career
Born in Tremp, Lleida, Catalonia, Urrea started his career at local club UE Lleida. On 12 June 2005 he made his debut for the first team, playing 18 minutes in a 1–0 Segunda División away loss against Real Murcia.

The following season, which ended in relegation to the Segunda División B, Urrea added another substitute appearance. He continued his career in the third tier the following years, with Lleida, Alicante CF, Ontinyent CF and UCAM Murcia CF.

References

External links

1987 births
Living people
People from Pallars Jussà
Sportspeople from the Province of Lleida
Spanish footballers
Footballers from Catalonia
Association football midfielders
Segunda División players
Segunda División B players
Tercera División players
UE Lleida players
Alicante CF footballers
Ontinyent CF players
UCAM Murcia CF players
SD Formentera players